The Chief of Naval Operations (CNO) is the highest-ranking active duty member of the United States Navy and is a member of the Joint Chiefs of Staff. The CNO reports directly to the Secretary of the Navy for the command, utilization of resources and operating efficiency of the Navy. Of the 29 CNOs, 27 were graduates of the United States Naval Academy (USNA). The Academy is an undergraduate college in Annapolis, Maryland, with the mission of educating and commissioning officers for the Navy and Marine Corps. The Academy is often referred to as Annapolis, while sports media refer to the Academy as "Navy" and the students as "Midshipmen"; this usage is officially endorsed. During the latter half of the 19th century and the first decades of the 20th, the United States Naval Academy was the primary source of U.S. Navy and Marine Corps officers, with the Class of 1881 being the first to provide officers to the Marine Corps. Graduates of the Academy are also given the option of entering the United States Army or United States Air Force. Most Midshipmen are admitted through the congressional appointment system. The curriculum emphasizes various fields of engineering.

This list is drawn from graduates of the Naval Academy who became CNOs. The Academy was founded in 1845 and graduated its first class in 1846. The first alumnus to graduate and go on to become a CNO was William S. Benson, who graduated from the Class of 1877. The current CNO, Jonathan Greenert, is also an Academy graduate. Four graduates subsequently became Chairman of the Joint Chiefs of Staff, three became ambassadors, three were recipients of the Navy Cross, and one was a recipient of the Distinguished Flying Cross.

Over 990 noted scholars from a variety of academic fields are Academy graduates, including 45 Rhodes Scholars and 16 Marshall Scholars. Additional notable graduates include 1 President of the United States, 2 Nobel Prize recipients, 52 astronauts and 73 Medal of Honor recipients.



Chiefs of Naval Operations
''"Class year" refers to the alumni's class year, which usually is the same year they graduated. However, in times of war, classes often graduate early. For example, the Class of 1942 actually graduated in 1941. This class became known as the "Pearl Harbor" class."

References
General

Inline citations

Annapolis
Academy alumni, famous list
Chiefs
United States Navy officers